This is a list of members of the Senate of Canada in the 42nd Canadian Parliament.

List of senators

 The province of Quebec has 24 Senate divisions which are constitutionally mandated. In all other provinces, a Senate division is strictly an optional designation of the senator's own choosing, and has no real constitutional or legal standing. A senator who does not choose a special senate division is designated a senator for the province at large.

Membership changes

The party standings in the Senate have changed during the 42nd Canadian Parliament as follows:

See also
List of House members of the 42nd Parliament of Canada
Women in the 42nd Canadian Parliament
List of current senators of Canada

References

External links

42
42nd Canadian Parliament
Senate